Dana Charles Reeve (née Morosini; March 17, 1961 – March 6, 2006) was an American actress, singer, and activist for disability causes. She was the wife of actor Christopher Reeve and mother of television reporter and anchor Will Reeve.

Early life and family
Reeve was born in Teaneck, New Jersey, to Charles Morosini (died 2018), a cardiologist, and Helen Simpson Morosini (died  2005). She was of Italian descent.

She grew up in the town of Greenburgh, New York, where she graduated from Edgemont High School in 1979.

She graduated summa cum laude and Phi Beta Kappa in English Literature from Middlebury College in Vermont in 1984. In 2004 she and husband, Christopher Reeve, received honorary Doctorates of Humane Letters from Middlebury.

She spent the junior year of her studies at the Royal Academy of Dramatic Art in London. In 1984, she pursued additional graduate studies in acting at the California Institute of the Arts in Valencia, California. 

She married actor Christopher Reeve in Williamstown, Massachusetts, on April 11, 1992, and they had a son, William Elliot "Will" Reeve, born on June 7, 1992. Will now reports for ABC News.

Reeve loved to ride horses. In 2005, she told Larry King: "I rode my whole life, and after Chris had his accident, I stopped riding, primarily because he loved it so much, and I think it really would have been painful for him if I was going off riding and he wasn't able to. And it didn't mean that much to me to drop."

Show business career
Her many singing and acting credits included appearances on television, where she had guest roles on Dick Wolf's Law & Order, Law & Order: Criminal Intent, soap operas All My Children as Eva Stroupe and Loving, among others. She performed at theatres on Broadway, off-Broadway, and at numerous regional theatres.

In 2000, she co-hosted a live daily talk show for women on the Lifetime Network with Deborah Roberts called Lifetime Live and also wrote a brief column for the defunct AccessLife.com These articles can be found at the Christopher Reeve Homepage. She sang the title song on the soundtrack of the HBO drama In the Gloaming, directed by her husband. Reeve also had another cameo in her husband's movie The Brooke Ellison Story as a teacher. 

She authored the book Care Packages: Letters to Christopher Reeve from Strangers and Other Friends. In 2004, she was performing in the Broadway-bound play Brooklyn Boy at South Coast Repertory in Costa Mesa, California when she had to rush home to reach her husband's bedside after he went into cardiac arrest and a coma. In April 2005, it was also announced that she signed a seven-figure book deal with Penguin Books to write about her relationship with her famous husband. It is not known how far Reeve got with writing the book before she died; the book was never published.

The children's book Dewey Doo-it Helps Owlie Fly Again: A Musical Storybook Inspired by Christopher Reeve was published in 2005 and included an audio to accompany the book with Mandy Patinkin reading the story as well as Reeve and Bernadette Peters singing.

On February 2, 2005, eight days before the death of her mother Helen, Reeve attended President George W. Bush's State of the Union address seated in the Capitol gallery in Washington, D.C. as the guest of Congressman Jim Langevin (D-RI).

Several months before her death, Reeve taped the PBS documentary The New Medicine focusing on the growing trend in medical care combining holistic and traditional treatment. The program premiered after her death, on March 29, 2006. She also worked on the computer-animated movie Everyone's Hero, a project with the working title Yankee Irving when her husband was the director at the time of his death. The film was released on September 15, 2006, and is dedicated to both her and Christopher Reeve.

Illness and death
In August 2005, ten months after the death of her husband, Reeve announced that she had been diagnosed with lung cancer. She had never smoked, but in her early career often sang in smoky bars and hotel lobbies.

In 2005, Reeve received the "Mother of the Year Award" from the American Cancer Society for her dedication and determination in raising her son after the loss of her husband. In her final public appearances, Reeve stated that the tumor had responded to therapy and was shrinking. She appeared at Madison Square Garden on January 12, 2006, and sang the Carole King song "Now and Forever" in honor of New York Rangers hockey player Mark Messier, whose number was retired that evening.

Reeve died on March 6, 2006, at Memorial Sloan Kettering Cancer Center in New York City, 11 days before her 45th birthday. On the night that she died, instead of having a live performer sing the national anthem at Madison Square Garden prior to the Rangers' game, a recording of Reeve singing was played. She arranged for her son, Will Reeve, to live with their next door neighbors so he could finish school where he started instead of being forced to move in with relatives elsewhere. Her burial was at Ferncliff Cemetery in Hartsdale, New York.

Episode 16 of the fifth season of Smallville titled "Hypnotic" is dedicated to her and the film Superman Returns is dedicated to both her and Christopher. The animated film Everyone's Hero (2006) is also dedicated in memory of Christopher and Dana Reeve.

Filmography

References

External links

Christopher and Dana Reeve Foundation

1961 births
2006 deaths
People from Teaneck, New Jersey
People from Greenburgh, New York
People from Pound Ridge, New York
California Institute of the Arts alumni
Edgemont Junior – Senior High School alumni
Middlebury College alumni
Dana
20th-century American actresses
20th-century American singers
21st-century American actresses
21st-century American singers
American people of Italian descent
Actresses from New Jersey
Actresses from New York (state)
Alumni of RADA
American soap opera actresses
American stage actresses
American television actresses
American voice actresses
Singers from New York (state)
Singers from New Jersey
20th-century American women singers
21st-century American women singers
Deaths from lung cancer in New York (state)